ASRS may refer to:

Adventist Society for Religious Studies, a Seventh-day Adventist scholarly community 
Air Sea Rescue Services, the British Second World War air sea rescue organisation, later renamed the RAF Search and Rescue Force
Amalgamated Society of Railway Servants, a former British trade union
Automated storage and retrieval system (AS/RS), computer-controlled methods for automatically placing and retrieving loads from specific storage locations
Aviation Safety Reporting System, the US Federal Aviation Administration voluntary system that allows aircrew to confidentially report near misses and close calls 
Adult ADHD Self-Report Scale, a self-reported questionnaire used to assist in the diagnosis of adult ADHD